Stade Municipal (literally 'municipal stadium') is a generic name for municipally owned, constructed, or operated sport stadia in French-speaking countries.

Benin 
 Stade Municipale (Porto-Novo), in Porto-Novo

Burkina Faso 
 Stade Municipal (Ouagadougou), in Ouagadougou
 Stade Municipal (Bobo Dioulasso), in Bobo Dioulasso

Cameroon 
 Stade Municipal (Bafang), in Bafang
 Stade Municipal de Bamendzi, in Bafoussam
 Stade Municipal de Guider, in Guider
 Stade Municipal (Akonolinga), in Akonolinga
 Stade Municipal (Dschang), in Dschang
 Stade Municipal (Foumban), in Foumban
 Stade Municipal (Maroua), in Maroua
 Stade Municipal (Yaoundé), in Yaounde

Canada 
 Stade Canac, formerly Stade Municipal, Quebec City
 Stade Quillorama, formerly Stade Municipal, Trois-Rivières

Democratic Republic of Congo 
 Stade Municipal de Lubumbashi, in Lubumbashi
 Stade Municipal de Vita Kabasha, in Vita Kabasha

Republic of the Congo 
 Stade Municipal (Pointe-Noire), in Pointe-Noire

Côte d'Ivoire 
 Stade Municipal d'Abidjan, Abidjan
 Stade Municipal (Bingerville), in Bingerville
 Stade Municipal (Bouna), in Bouna
 Stade Municipal (Daloa), in Daloa
 Stade Municipal (Odienné), in Odienne
 Stade Municipal (San-Pédro), in San Pédro

France 
 Stade Municipal d'Albi
 Stade Municipal de Balma
 Stade Municipal du Ray, in Nice
 Stade Municipal Georges Lefèvre, in Saint-Germain-en-Laye
 Stade Municipal La Reole
 Stade Municipal (Saint-Estève)
 Stade Municipal Saint-Symphorien, in Metz
 Stadium Municipal, in Toulouse

French Guiana 
 Stade Municipal (Macouria), in Macouria
 Stade Municipal (Matoury), in Matoury
 Stade Municipal (Sinnamary), in Sinnamary

Luxembourg 
 Stade Municipal de la Ville de Differdange, in Differdange
 Stade Municipal (Oberkorn), in Oberkorn
 Stade Municipal, Pétange, in Pétange
 Stade Municipal, Rumelange, in Rumelange
 Stade Municipal, Schifflange, in Schifflange
 Stade Josy Barthel, was called Stade Municipale until 1993

Madagascar 
 Stade Municipal de Mahamasina, in Antananarivo

Mali 
 Stade Municipal de Bamako, in Bamako
 Stade Municipal de Commune II, in Bamako
 Stade Municipal de Koulikoro, in Koulikoro
 Stade Municipal de USFAS, in Bamako

Morocco 
 Stade Municipal (Kenitra), in Kenitra

Senegal 
 Stade Municipal de Djourbel, in Djourbel
 Stade Municipal de Mbour, in Mbour
 Stade Municipal de Richard Toll, in Richard Toll

Switzerland 
 Stade Municipal (Yverdon), in Yverdon-les-Bains

Togo 
 Stade Municipal (Anié)
 Stade Municipal (Kara)
 Stade Municipal (Kpalimé)
 Stade Municipal (Lavié)
 Stade Municipal (Lomé)
 Stade Municipal (Niamtougou), in Niamtougou
 Stade Municipal (Notsé)
 Stade Municipal (Sansanne Mango)
 Stade Municipal (Sokodé)
 Stade Municipal (Womé)

Tunisia 
 Stade Municipal de Gabès, in Gabès

See also
 Municipal Stadium (disambiguation)
 Estadio Municipal (disambiguation)